Boon Lake may refer to:

Cities, towns, townships etc.
Boon Lake Township, Minnesota

Lakes
Boon Lake (Minnesota), a lake in Renville County
Boon Lake (Rhode Island)